Bečice is the name of several locations in the Czech Republic:

 Bečice (České Budějovice District), a village in the South Bohemian Region
 Bečice (Tábor District), a village in the South Bohemian Region